Xoxo Exo (stylized in all caps) is a South Korean reality show starring K-pop boy group Exo.

Background
Xoxo Exo is a television reality show that shows the band's activities after their comeback with the EP Overdose in 2014. As it follows the group in their promotions, it also shows them on and off-stage in a global environment. The "xoxo" in the title stands for "kisses and hugs," symbolizing the fans' love for Exo.

Controversies
Xoxo Exo's second episode which aired on May 16, 2014, was originally intended to be a live broadcast of the band, but was cancelled due to member Kris starting a lawsuit against S.M. Entertainment to nullify his contract on the day before. Instead of a live broadcast, footage of Exo's first Japan fan event "Exo's Greeting Party in Japan, Hello" was aired.

Episodes

References

South Korean reality television series
Exo
K-pop television series
Mnet (TV channel) original programming
Television series by SM C&C